The Prince of Egypt is a musical play with music and lyrics by Stephen Schwartz, and a book by Philip LaZebnik. Based on the 1998 animated film of the same name, the musical follows the life of Moses from being a prince of Egypt to his ultimate destiny of leading the Children of Israel out of Egypt.

Plot

Act One
In Ancient Egypt, more than 3,000 years ago, the Hebrews labor, desperate for deliverance from slavery. Egyptian soldiers, under orders to kill all Hebrew firstborn boys, snatch babies from their mothers' arms. Yocheved sings a last lullaby to her newborn, then places him in a basket and sets it out on the Nile, where it drifts into the Queen's pleasure garden. Queen Tuya is there with her infant son, Ramses, but when she finds the new baby in the bulrushes, she decides to adopt him and names him Moses ("Deliver Us").

Eighteen years later, high-spirited teenagers Moses and Ramses race their chariots, destroying the marketplace and part of a temple, infuriating the high priest, Hotep ("Faster"). Afterwards, their father Pharaoh Seti berates Ramses for his irresponsibility ("One Weak Link") and tells him he must marry the arrogant and ambitious Princess Nefertari as a political alliance. Moses defends Ramses to his father, but left alone, he wishes he could leave a mark on the world as his brother will one day ("Footprints on the Sand").

Some months later, Seti returns from a desert campaign against the rebellious Midianites ("Seti's Return"). To celebrate his victory, Seti gives Ramses a captured Midianite girl as his slave, Tzipporah ("Dance to the Day"). Later that evening, Tzipporah breaks away from her guards and winds up in Moses' bedchamber, where she defiantly says she will always be free and escapes. Moses pursues Tzipporah into the marketplace, where he runs into Miriam, his real sister, and his brother Aaron. Miriam tells him the truth about his birth, and when he refuses to believe her, she sings him their mother's lullaby, which stirs old memories in Moses. Distraught, he races back to the palace, but cannot escape his memories. He finds artwork of the Hebrew babies being drowned by Seti's men, and the Pharaoh sadly confirms that he had to make the sacrifice for the good of Egypt. Tuya finds him and tells him the truth: he is a Hebrew, but now he must forget that and continue to live as he always has, and Moses agrees ("All I Ever Wanted").

The next day, Moses is with Ramses and Hotep at the temple worksite. He attempts to act as if nothing has changed, but when he sees a guard whipping a Hebrew slave, he attacks the guard and accidentally kills him. Hotep proclaims that Moses must be punished. Moses runs off and Ramses pursues him, saying he will hide the truth of Moses' identity. Moses says that isn't possible and runs into the desert ("Make It Right"). Barely surviving ("Moses in the Desert"), Moses encounters the Midianites, led by their High Priest Jethro, who welcomes him into their tribe and tells him their philosophy ("Through Heaven's Eyes").

As the time passes, Moses and Ramses miss one another ("Faster" reprise), but Moses has become a shepherd and fallen in love with Tzipporah, Jethro's daughter, whom he has re-encountered ("Never in a Million Years"). Then one day, following a stray sheep, Moses encounters a miraculous burning bush and hears the voice of God commanding him to return to Egypt and free his people. Moses sets off with Tzipporah as, back in Egypt, Seti dies and Ramses is crowned Pharaoh ("Act I Finale").

Act Two
Moses returns to Egypt ("Return to Egypt") and confronts Ramses, now married to Nefertari and the father of a son. Ramses agrees to free the Hebrews if Moses will come back to court as his adviser ("Always On Your Side"), and the exultant Moses informs the Hebrews they have been freed ("Simcha"). But Hotep appears, holding a royal decree that doubles the Hebrews' work load. Under the influence of Hotep and Nefertari, Ramses has broken his promise to Moses. The Hebrews angrily drive Moses away ("Deliver Us" reprise).

Moses finds Ramses sailing down the Nile on the royal barge, and warns him that if he does not keep his promise, Egypt will suffer. When Ramses refuses, the waters of the Nile are turned to blood, and further plagues of disease, fire and darkness ravage Egypt. Urged by Tuya to make peace with his brother, Moses pleads with Ramses to free the Hebrews, but Ramses will not relent ("The Plagues"). And so, the final plague occurs, the death of the Egyptian first born, including Ramses' and Nefertari's son. Moses is devastated by the death and destruction he has caused ("For the Rest of My Life"). Ramses tells Moses that the Hebrews can go, while Nefertari grieves over the dead body of their son ("Heartless"). Moses tells Miriam the Hebrews are finally free, but he is too distraught to lead them. Miriam and Tzipporah, along with the freed Hebrews, revive his spirits ("When You Believe").

Moses leads the Hebrews to the edge of the Red Sea, where Tzipporah mourns the fact that she will never see her family again ("Never in a Million Years" reprise). Suddenly, the Egyptian army appears in the distance, led by Ramses and Hotep, and the Hebrews appear to be trapped. Needing a miracle to escape, Moses holds out his hand and the Red Sea parts. The Hebrews pass through the Red Sea while Moses remains to offer himself as a ransom to Ramses for the Hebrews' freedom. Hotep urges Ramses to kill Moses, but Ramses refuses, saying there has been too much death, and he will be the weak link, breaking the chain of destruction. Moses and Ramses embrace, brothers once again, and then Moses and Tzipporah follow the Hebrews. Hotep commandeers the Egyptian army and pursues Moses and the Hebrews into the parted Red Sea, but once the Hebrews have reached safety, the waters fall back, drowning Hotep and the soldiers. On opposite sides of the Red Sea, Moses and Ramses face their separate destinies, knowing that they will always have a brother who supports and understands them ("Act II Finale").

Productions

Mountain View 
The Prince of Egypt made its debut at TheatreWorks Silicon Valley, at the Mountain View Center for the Performing Arts in Mountain View, California on October 6, 2017, choreographed by Sean Cheesman and directed by Scott Schwartz.

Copenhagen 
The musical had its international premiere in a Danish production on April 6, 2018, at the Fredericia Teater in Fredericia, then followed by a Summer season at the Royal Danish Theatre in Copenhagen 2019. Fredericia Theater believed that for a larger, older and more visited stage, something new and grander was more fitting, and so they reinvented the visual design and created new dance choreographies. The song "The Plagues" omit the lyrics pertaining to Moses and Rameses' relationship. The song "Playing with the Big Boys" was omitted, as was the role of Huy, however the song's melody and lyrics mentioning the names of the Ancient Egyptian gods remain having been folded into the scene of the Ten Plagues instead.

Utah 
The Tuacahn Amphitheatre in Ivins, Utah also staged a production of the musical from July 13 through October 20, 2018.Production Credits: Director: Scott S. Anderson, Choreography: Sean Ceeseman, Music Direction: Christopher Babbage, Scenic: Bradley Sheldon, Lighting, Cory Paddack, Costumes: Maria Lennin, Stage Managers: A.J. Sullivan, H. Housewright, Hannah Morris; Jessica Browning; Pyrotechnics: Hyram Berlow.

West End 
A significantly revised new version opened at the Dominion Theatre in London's West End for a limited 39-week engagement from 5 February to 31 October 2020, with an opening night on 25 February 2020, directed by Scott Schwartz, choreographed by Sean Cheesman, and a design team including Kevin Depinet, Ann Hould-Ward, Mike Billings, Gareth Owen, Jon Driscoll, and Chris Fisher. The West End version featured new costumes by Hould-Ward, sets by Depinet, projections by Driscoll, illusions by Fisher, sound by Owens, and hair/wigs/makeup by Campbell young Associates, as well as a world premiere song. The cast of 38 was headed by Luke Brady (Moses), Liam Tamne (Ramses), Christine Allado (Tzipporah), Alexia Khadime (Miriam), Joe Dixon (Seti), Debbie Kurup (Queen Tuya), Gary Wilmot (Jethro), Mercedesz Csampai (Yocheved), Adam Pearce (Hotep), Tanisha Spring (Nefertari) and Silas Wyatt-Barke (Aaron). The production was forced to close on 17 March after just 6 weeks, due to the government-mandated  closure of all theatres in response to the COVID-19 pandemic in the United Kingdom. The show reopened on 1 July 2021 and concluded its run on 8 January 2022. Clive Rowe starred as Jethro from 1 July to 16 October 2021. The production has been filmed by Universal Pictures Content Group for a future broadcast.

Musical numbers
''Titles of songs which appeared in the original 1998 animated film are in bold.

 Act I
 "Deliver Us" - Yocheved, Queen Tuya, Young Miriam and Company
 "Faster" - Moses, Ramses, Hotep and Company
 "One Weak Link" - Seti
 "Footprints on the Sand" - Moses
 "Seti's Return" - Company
 "Dance to the Day" - Tzipporah
 "All I Ever Wanted" - Miriam, Moses, Yocheved, Seti and Queen Tuya
 "Make It Right" - Ramses and Moses
 "Moses in the Desert" - Moses and Company
 "Through Heaven's Eyes" - Jethro and Company
 "Faster (Reprise)" - Ramses and Moses
 "Never in a Million Years" - Tzipporah and Moses
 "Act I Finale: Deliver Us (Reprise) / All I Ever Wanted (Reprise)" - Hotep, Ramses, Nefertari, Queen Tuya, Moses, Jethro and Company

 Act II
 "Return to Egypt" - Tzipporah, Hotep and Company
 "Always On Your Side" - Ramses and Moses
 "Simcha" - Moses, Miriam, Tzipporah and Company
 "Deliver Us (Reprise II)" - Aaron and Company
 "The Plagues" - Moses, Hotep, Ramses, Nefertari, Miriam, Queen Tuya, Aaron and Company
 "For the Rest of My Life" - Moses
 "Heartless" - Nefertari
 "When You Believe" - Miriam, Tzipporah, Moses and Company
 "Never in a Million Years (Reprise)" - Tzipporah and Moses
 "Act II Finale: When You Believe (Reprise) / Footprints on the Sand (Reprise)" - Miriam, Moses, Yocheved, Tzipporah, Seti, Queen Tuya, Jethro, Aaron, Company

Cast recording
On March 15, 2020, Playbill announced that a cast recording of the West End production would be released by Ghostlight Records.  It was released on April 3, 2020. The album was nominated for a 2021 Grammy Award for Best Musical Theater Album.

Casts

References

External links
 

2017 musicals
The Prince of Egypt
Musicals based on animated films
Musicals based on religious traditions
Musicals based on the Bible
Ten Commandments
Cultural depictions of Moses
Cultural depictions of Nefertari
West End musicals
Musicals by Stephen Schwartz